Grand is the third album by Erin McKeown.  Released in 2003, it was her first album for Nettwerk Records.

Track listing
 Slung-Lo
 Cinematic
 Taste of You
 Born to Hum
 Civilians
 Envelopes of Glassine
 How to Be a Lady
 Better Wife
 Cosmopolitans
 Lucky Day
 Innocent Fiction
 James!
 Starlit
 Vera

Erin McKeown albums
2003 albums